Air Transat is a Canadian airline based in Montreal, Quebec. Founded in 1986, it operates scheduled and charter flights serving 60 destinations in 25 countries. Air Transat is owned and operated by Transat A.T. Inc., with a fleet of 31 aircraft.

History

Early years (1986–1999)

François Legault founded Air Transat with other business partners such as Jean-Marc Eustache, Philippe Sureau, Lina de Cesare, Yvon Lecavalier, and Pierre Ménard. Legault left the company in 1997 with no forewarning after a dispute with business partners, who only found out after the fact.

Air Transat made its inaugural flight on 14 November 1987, travelling from Montreal to Acapulco. Six years later, Air Transat assumed defunct Nationair's maintenance base and aircraft.  It is a wholly owned subsidiary of Transat A.T. Inc.

Expansion (2000–2018)

On 13 February 2009, Transat A.T. announced a five-year partnership with CanJet. Since 1 May 2009, Transat Tours Canada has chartered CanJet's Boeing 737 aircraft flying from Canadian cities to various destinations. This replaced an agreement with Calgary-based Westjet.

On 13 February 2011, Air Transat Flight TS163 operated with their first all-female flight crew from Cancun to Vancouver. The airline has won many awards, including the 2012, 2018, and 2019 Skytrax World's Best Leisure Airline Awards.

On 12 September 2013, Air Transat struck a seasonal lease deal with Air France-KLM leisure carrier Transavia France, covering the lease of up to nine Boeing 737-800s by 2019. The deal, which extends a 2010 winter capacity agreement, called for Transavia France to lease four 737-800s to Air Transat during winter 2014, five in 2016, six in 2017, seven in 2018, and eight in 2019.

Although the first two groups of refugees from Syria arrived in Canada on government aircraft in December 2015, the next two groups were on Air Transat aircraft; the first was Flight TS8500 from Amman, Jordan to Toronto, which departed on 20 December.  Air Transat was unlikely to be the exclusive airline chartered by the Canadian government, especially if more than 35,000 refugees would arrive in 2016. A spokesman advised the Toronto Star that the company had been confirmed as the airline that would bring the second group to Canada on 21 December. In a Transat press release, Jean-François Lemay, the carrier's general manager  made the following statement, "We are very pleased to be the first Canadian airline company to engage in this major humanitarian effort, and to be assisting the Canadian government and international authorities in this way."

In May 2017, Air Transat and Flair Air were accused by a CBC News story of misleading customers and regulators in both Canada and Mexico by marketing and selling nonstop tickets between Edmonton and Cancun.  CBC uncovered a letter in which the airlines admitted that they would frequently divert for a technical stop to refuel.

Recent developments (2019–present)

In January 2020, Forbes Canada named Air Transat in its list of best employers, to eighth place nationally.

Proposed acquisition by Air Canada
On 16 May 2019, Transat AT, the company that owns Air Transat, announced it was in exclusive talks to be purchased by Air Canada. An offer was subsequently made by the latter at C$13 per share and another company, Group Mach, offered C$14.

On 27 June 2019, the board of Transat AT accepted Air Canada's all-cash bid of C$520 million and did not comment on the C$527.6 proposal from Group Mach because the talks with Air Canada were still exclusive. The deal required approval by two-thirds of shareholders; some major investors and some financial analysts stated that the offer is below the true value of the company. Regulatory and governmental approval would be required for the sale of Transat AT. A May report by the Canadian Broadcasting Corporation stated, "regulatory approvals are no sure thing". If the Air Canada purchase were successful, Air Transat would continue to operate as a separate brand.

By 12 August 2019, Air Canada had increased its offer by nearly 40% to C$18 per share from $13, valuing the acquisition at $720 million (US$544 million), to obtain backing from Letko Brosseau, Transat AT's largest shareholder with 19% of the company. That same day, the Quebec Administrative Court of Financial Markets rejected the rival bid from Groupe Mach; on 23 August, a 95% majority of Transat's voting shareholders approved the $18 per share Air Canada proposal. The proposed transaction was to be publicly assessed by Transport Canada  until 2 May 2020, with the buyout to close after that date.

The buyout was delayed by the then ongoing impact of the COVID-19 pandemic on aviation, with the share price of Transat AT falling to $5.16 by July 2020. The buyout had not closed by 13 October 2020, when the two parties agreed to a revised offer of $5 per share, reducing the total value of the acquisition to $180 million.

On 2 April 2021, the deal was dropped following a failure to secure European Commission approval.

COVID-19 pandemic 
On 23 July 2020, Air Transat announced that it would resume its service following a COVID-19 pandemic-induced interruption of 112 days. In January 2021, as the pandemic continued, Air Transat announced it was again suspending its regular operations from 29 January to 30 April 2021 and all operations from 14 February to 30 April 2021.

British consumer site MoneySavingExpert named Air Transat as one of the worst-performing travel firms for refunding passengers whose flights or trips were cancelled. The United Kingdom's Civil Aviation Authority (CAA), in a report examining the impact of COVID-19 on airline carriers' treatment of passengers to and from the UK during the pandemic, found that Air Transat was one of the airlines failing to provide cash refunds to passengers whose flights had been cancelled by the airline, in breach of the Flight Compensation Regulation. The regulation requires airlines to refund passengers whose flights are cancelled under any circumstances, including the COVID-19 pandemic; the report also noted that CAA's inquiries, while preparing the report, had resulted in Air Transat assuring it that all cash payments would henceforth be handled properly.

Destinations

Air Transat specializes in charter flights from 19 Canadian cities to vacation destinations, mainly to 15 countries in the south during winter and in 11 European countries during summer. Also, some destinations are provided all year round by the airline. During the summer season, its main destinations are Europe and in the winter season, the Caribbean, Mexico, the United States, and Central America, though the airline operates many year-round flights to Europe from their Toronto and Montreal bases. Its main Canadian gateways are Montréal-Pierre Elliott Trudeau International Airport and Toronto Pearson International Airport. The airline also has operations at Halifax Stanfield International Airport, Ottawa Macdonald–Cartier International Airport, and Québec City Jean Lesage International Airport, among others.

Magazine
Atmosphere is the semi-annual inflight magazine of Air Transat. It was founded in 2006 and the first issue was published in March 2006. The magazine is published in English and in French. The publisher is Business Class Media. Formerly it was published on a quarterly basis, but then was published semi-annually.

Fleet

Current fleet
As of October 2022, Air Transat operates an all-Airbus fleet consisting of the following aircraft:

Additionally, a Boeing 737-800 is still registered to Air Transat by Transport Canada but not listed on Air Transat's official website.

Previously operated
Air Transat has operated several other aircraft types in the past, including:
 Airbus A310-300
 Airbus A320-200
 Boeing 727-200
 Boeing 737-400
 Boeing 737-700
 Boeing 757-200
 Lockheed L-1011-1 TriStar
 Lockheed L-1011-500 TriStar

Accidents and incidents
 On 6 July 2001, Air Transat Flight 906, a Lockheed L-1011 TriStar, made a return to Lyon–Saint-Exupéry Airport after encountering severe hail. The plane returned safely, but was written off. It is still used today for emergency training at Lyon Airport near Lufthansa Cargo.
 On 24 August 2001, Air Transat Flight 236, an Airbus A330-200, en route from Toronto to Lisbon with 306 crew and passengers, piloted by Captain Robert Piche and First Officer Dirk de Jager, made an emergency landing in the Azores without engine power due to fuel starvation over the Atlantic Ocean. The aircraft safely landed at Lajes Air Base, on Terceira Island. The aircraft was evacuated in 90 seconds. All 306 passengers on board survived. An investigation revealed that the cause of the accident was a fuel leak in the number-two engine, which was caused by an incorrect part installed in the hydraulics system by Air Transat maintenance staff. The part did not maintain adequate clearance between the hydraulic lines and the fuel line, allowing vibration in the hydraulic lines to degrade the fuel line and cause the leak. The aircraft involved in the incident was repaired and remained in service with Air Transat until March 2020. The incident went down in history as the longest non powered flight and landing by a commercial airliner.
 On 6 March 2005, Air Transat Flight 961 experienced a structural failure in which the rudder detached in flight. The flight crew were able to regain enough control of the aircraft to return safely to Varadero. The investigation that followed determined that the manufacturer's inspection procedure for the composite rudder was not adequate. Inspection procedures for composite structures on airliners were changed because of this accident.
 On 18 July 2016, Air Transat Flight 725, an Airbus A310-300, en route from Glasgow to Toronto with 250 passengers was grounded overnight following the arrest of pilots Captain Jean-François Perreault and Imran Zafar Syed for allegedly preparing to fly under the influence of alcohol.  The flight eventually flew under new crew and arrived in Toronto at noon the following day.  Both pilots were cleared of all charges in April 2018.
 On 31 July 2017, Air Transat Flight 157, an Airbus A330-200, en route from Brussels to Montréal-Trudeau was diverted to Ottawa due to a chain of storms passing through the Montreal area. More than 300 passengers were kept on the plane without water, electricity, or air conditioning and rationed food for 6 hours. A passenger called 911 due to the deteriorating situation, with some passengers complaining of suffocation. Airport authorities responded by delivering water and disembarking passengers, including those complaining of suffocation injuries. Air Transat blamed congestion at Ottawa's airport for the situation, where airport administration stated that the pilots asked for no help during the situation. The event enraged Canadian lawmakers pushing to improve Canada's passenger bill of rights.

References

External links 

 
1986 establishments in Quebec
Air Transport Association of Canada
Airlines established in 1986
Canadian brands
Canadian companies established in 1986
Companies based in Montreal
Low-cost carriers